Jaime Elizabeth Komer (née Hipp, born September 1, 1981, in Fresno, California) is a former female water polo goalkeeper from the United States, who won the gold medal with the United States women's national water polo team at the 2007 World Championship and the 2007 Pan American Games, and a silver medal at the 2008 Beijing Olympic Games.

In June 2009, Komer was again named to the USA Water Polo Women's Senior National Team for the 2009 FINA World Championships, earning another Gold medal.

Personal and early life
She and Matt Komer, a former Professional Volleyball Player, were married in 2007. They were both All-Americans and National Champions while at UCLA. Jaime and Matt have started their own company, AYT lifestyle, a proactive lifestyle company that combines yoga, pilates, sport, nutrition, travel and philanthropy to initiate positive change. They are based in Orange County, California but find themselves traveling worldwide.

See also
 United States women's Olympic water polo team records and statistics
 List of Olympic medalists in water polo (women)
 List of women's Olympic water polo tournament goalkeepers
 List of world champions in women's water polo
 List of World Aquatics Championships medalists in water polo

References

External links
 

1981 births
Living people
Sportspeople from Fresno, California
American female water polo players
Water polo goalkeepers
Olympic silver medalists for the United States in water polo
Water polo players at the 2008 Summer Olympics
Medalists at the 2008 Summer Olympics
World Aquatics Championships medalists in water polo
Pan American Games gold medalists for the United States
Pan American Games medalists in water polo
Water polo players at the 2007 Pan American Games
Medalists at the 2007 Pan American Games
21st-century American women